Eric de Pablos Solà (born 8 March 1999) is an Andorran footballer who plays as a right-back for UE Santa Coloma and the Andorra national team.

Career
De Pablos made his international debut for Andorra on 3 June 2021, coming on as a substitute in the 73rd minute for Moisés San Nicolás in a friendly match against the Republic of Ireland. The home match finished as a 4–1 loss.

Career statistics

International

References

External links
 
 
 

1999 births
Living people
People from Andorra la Vella
Andorran footballers
Andorra youth international footballers
Andorra under-21 international footballers
Andorra international footballers
Association football fullbacks
FC Andorra players
FC Ordino players
UE Santa Coloma players
FC Santa Coloma players
Primera Divisió players